Fayette County is a county located in the U.S. state of Texas. As of the 2020 census, the population was 24,435. Its county seat is La Grange. The county was created in 1837 and organized the next year.

History
Fayette County was established in 1837 from land given by Bastrop and Colorado Counties.  It is named for the Marquis de Lafayette, a French nobleman who became an American Revolutionary War hero.

An early resident of Brazoria County and then Fayette County, Joel Walter Robison, fought in the Texas Revolution and served in the Texas House of Representatives.

More than a dozen historic properties are listed on the National Register of Historic Places in Fayette County.

Fayette County is the location of the real Chicken Ranch, which was the basis of the musical play and feature film The Best Little Whorehouse in Texas.

Geography

Adjacent counties

 Lee County (north)
 Washington County (northeast)
 Austin County (east)
 Colorado County (southeast)
 Lavaca County (south)
 Gonzales County (southwest)
 Caldwell County (west)
 Bastrop County (northwest)

Demographics

Note: the US Census treats Hispanic/Latino as an ethnic category. This table excludes Latinos from the racial categories and assigns them to a separate category. Hispanics/Latinos can be of any race.

As of the census of 2000,  21,804 people, 8,722 households, and 6,044 families resided in the county.  The population density was 23 people per square mile (9/km2).  The 11,113 housing units  averaged 12 per square mile (5/km2).  The racial makeup of the county was 84.58% White, 7.01% African American, 0.36% Native American, 0.22% Asian, 6.72% from other races, and 1.11% from two or more races.  About 12.78% of the population were Hispanic or Latino of any race; 34.9% were of German, 16.4% Czech, 7.6% American, and 5.3% English ancestry according to Census 2000.

Christianity is the number-one religion and Judaism is the second.

Of the 8,722 households, 28.50% had children under the age of 18 living with them, 58.00% were married couples living together, 7.80% had a female householder with no husband present, and 30.70% were not families. About 28.00% of all households were made up of individuals, and 16.40% had someone living alone who was 65 years of age or older.  The average household size was 2.44 and the average family size was 2.97.

In the county, the population was distributed as 23.20% under the age of 18, 7.00% from 18 to 24, 23.60% from 25 to 44, 24.20% from 45 to 64, and 22.00% who were 65 years of age or older.  The median age was 43 years. For every 100 females, there were 93.70 males.  For every 100 females age 18 and over, there were 91.00 males.

Males had a median income of $29,008 versus $20,859 for females. The per capita income for the county was $18,888. About 8.10% of families and 11.40% of the population were below the poverty line, including 12.70% of those under age 18 and 13.50% of those age 65 or over.

Transportation

Airport
The county owns Fayette Regional Air Center, in an unincorporated area west of LaGrange.

Major highways

  Interstate 10
  U.S. Highway 77
  U.S. Highway 90
  U.S. Highway 290
  State Highway 71
  State Highway 95
  State Highway 159
  State Highway 237

Media 
Fayette County is home to three newspapers and two radio stations.

Newspapers 
 Fayette County Record
  Schulenburg Sticker
 Flatonia Argus

Radio 
 KVLG/KBUK
 KTIMe

Communities

Cities
 Carmine
 Ellinger
 Fayetteville
 La Grange (county seat)
 Schulenburg

Towns
 Flatonia
 Round Top

Unincorporated communities
 
 Ammannsville
 Cistern
 Dubina
 Engle
 Freyburg
 High Hill
 Holman
 Hostyn
 Kirtley
 Ledbetter
 Muldoon
 Mullins Prairie
 Nechanitz
 O'Quinn
 Oldenburg
 Park
 Plum
 Praha
 Rabbs Prairie
 Rek Hill
 Roznov
 Rutersville
 Swiss Alp
 Waldeck
 Walhalla
 Warda
 Warrenton
 West Point
 Willow Springs
 Winchester
 Winedale

Ghost towns

 Biegel
 Black Jack Springs
 Bluff
 Gay Hill
 Haw Creek
 Pin Oak
 Stella

Politics

Education
School districts:
 Fayetteville Independent School District
 Flatonia Independent School District
 Giddings Independent School District
 La Grange Independent School District
 Round Top-Carmine Independent School District
 Schulenburg Independent School District
 Smithville Independent School District
 Weimar Independent School District

Most of Fayette County is assigned to Blinn Junior College District. Austin Community College is the designated community college for portions of Fayette County in Smithville ISD.

See also

 Adelsverein
 Museums in Central Texas
 Nassau Plantation
 National Register of Historic Places listings in Fayette County, Texas
 Recorded Texas Historic Landmarks in Fayette County
 The Chicken Ranch, and The Best Little Whorehouse in Texas

References

External links

 Fayette County government's website
 
 Historic materials from Fayette County, hosted by the Portal to Texas History

 
1838 establishments in the Republic of Texas
Populated places established in 1838
ZZ Top